Tevita Taufui (born 21 March 1988) is a Tongan rugby union player who played as a centre for  and  in New Zealand's national provincial competitions and for the Tonga national rugby union team.

Senior career

After debuting for the Manawatu Turbos during the 2009 Air New Zealand Cup, the next 5 years of his career were ones of ups and downs.   Making the ITM Cup squad in 3 of his 5 seasons in Manawatu, playing 16 times and scoring 3 tries.   Stifled by a lack of opportunities, he headed to Waikato and played club rugby with the Melville Club.

2016 was his breakthrough year; after helping Melville to win a first Breweries Shield in 35 years in July, he was named in Waikato's 2016 Mitre 10 Cup squad.   He debuted for the Mooloo in their Ranfurly Shield defence against Thames Valley on 6 June 2016 and made 11 Ranfurly Shield and Mitre 10 Cup appearances during the season, scoring 2 tries in the process.

International

References

1988 births
Living people
Tongan rugby union players
Tonga international rugby union players
Rugby union centres
Waikato rugby union players
Manawatu rugby union players